Alleghany County is a county located in the U.S. state of North Carolina. As of the 2020 census, the population was 10,888. Its county seat is Sparta.

History
The county was formed in 1859 from the eastern part of Ashe County and was named for the Allegheny Mountains.  Numerous boundary adjustments have been made since it was established, but none of these have resulted in new counties.

Geography

It is the fourth-smallest county in North Carolina by total area with just over 235 square miles, ranking 97 out of 100 total counties in the state.

Alleghany County is located in northwestern North Carolina, and its northern border is with the State of Virginia. The county is located entirely within the Appalachian Mountains region of western North Carolina. The plateau is crossed by numerous hills and mountains. The major rivers of Alleghany County are the New River, and the Little River; the latter flows through the town of Sparta, the county seat.

Isolated by mountainous terrain from the remainder of North Carolina to the east, Alleghany County was described in the 19th and early 20th centuries as one of the Lost Provinces of North Carolina.

In the winter, however, temperatures can frequently be colder than would be expected in a southern state. Daytime highs can fall into the teens or lower, and snowfall can be extremely heavy at times.

National protected area 
 Blue Ridge Parkway (part)

State and local protected areas 
 Bullhead Mountain State Natural Area
 Cumberland Knob Recreation Area (part)
 Doughton Recreation Area (part)
 New River State Park (park)
 Raven Knob Scout Reservation (part)
 Stone Mountain State Park (part) 
 Thurmond Chatham Wildlife Management Area (part)

Major water bodies 
 Brush Creek
 Elk Creek
 Laurel Creek
 Little River
 New River (Kanawha River tributary)
 Pine Swamp Creek
 Prather Creek
 Rock Creek
 South Fork New River

Adjacent counties
 Grayson County, Virginia - north
 Surry County - east
 Wilkes County - south
 Ashe County - west

Major highways

Demographics

2020 census

As of the 2020 United States census, there were 10,888 people, 4,920 households, and 3,390 families residing in the county.

2000 census
As of the census of 2000, there were 10,677 people, 4,593 households, and 3,169 families residing in the county.  The population density was 46 people per square mile (18/km2).  There were 6,412 housing units at an average density of 27 per square mile (11/km2).  The racial makeup of the county was 95.69% White, 1.23% Black or African American, 0.26% Native American, 0.20% Asian, 0.01% Pacific Islander, 1.75% from other races, and 0.86% from two or more races.  4.96% of the population were Hispanic or Latino of any race.

There were 4,593 households, out of which 24.80% had children under the age of 18 living with them, 58.30% were married couples living together, 7.50% had a female householder with no husband present, and 31.00% were non-families. 27.80% of all households were made up of individuals, and 14.00% had someone living alone who was 65 years of age or older.  The average household size was 2.28 and the average family size was 2.75.

In the county, the population was spread out, with 19.40% under the age of 18, 7.40% from 18 to 24, 26.30% from 25 to 44, 27.70% from 45 to 64, and 19.20% who were 65 years of age or older.  The median age was 43 years. For every 100 females there were 97.10 males.  For every 100 females age 18 and over, there were 95.50 males.

The median income for a household in the county was $29,244, and the median income for a family was $38,473. Males had a median income of $25,462 versus $18,851 for females. The per capita income for the county was $17,691.  About 11.30% of families and 17.20% of the population were below the poverty line, including 20.80% of those under age 18 and 25.00% of those age 65 or over.

Government and politics
Alleghany County is a member of the regional High Country Council of Governments.

Communities

Town
 Sparta (county seat and largest town)

Townships
Cherry Lane
Cranberry
Gap Civil
Glade Creek
Piney Creek
Prathers Creek
Whitehead

Unincorporated communities
 Cherry Lane
 Ennice
 Glade Valley
 Laurel Springs
 Piney Creek
 Roaring Gap
 Scottville
 Twin Oaks

Population ranking
The population ranking of the following table is based on the 2022 estimate of Alleghany County.

† county seat

Notable people
 Robert L. Doughton (1863–1954), United States Congressman from Alleghany County from 1911 to 1953. From 1933 to 1947 he was the Chairman of the House Ways and Means Committee. He used his influence as Chairman to create the Blue Ridge Parkway, which runs along the county's eastern and southern borders. Doughton Park, the largest and most popular park on the Parkway, is named in his honor. He also played a major role in the passage of the Social Security Act.
 Rufus A. Doughton (1857–1946), older brother of Robert Doughton. He served as the Speaker of the North Carolina House of Representatives, and was Lieutenant Governor of North Carolina from 1893 to 1897.
 Del Reeves (1932–2007), country music entertainer on the United Artists record label.  He became a member of the Grand Ole Opry in 1966 and his record "Girl on the Billboard" sold over a million copies.
 Zach Galifianakis (born 1969), stand-up comedian and actor, lives on a farm near Sparta and splits his time between the farm and his work in New York City.
 Bertie Dickens (1902-1994), old-time banjo player who lived most of her life in Ennice, North Carolina. She received the North Carolina Heritage Award in 1992.

See also
 List of counties in North Carolina
 National Register of Historic Places listings in Alleghany County, North Carolina
 List of Highway Historical Markers in Alleghany County, North Carolina
 North Carolina State Parks
 National Park Service

References

External links

 
 
 Alleghany News

 
1859 establishments in North Carolina
Western North Carolina
Counties of Appalachia
Populated places established in 1859